A social panic is a state where a social or community group reacts negatively and in an extreme or irrational manner to unexpected or unforeseen changes in their expected social status quo. According to Folk Devils and Moral Panics by Stanley Cohen,  the definition can be broken down to many different sections. The sections, which were identified by Erich Goode and Nachman Ben-Yehuda in 1994, include concern, hostility, consensus, disproportionality, and volatility. Concern, which is not to be mistaken with fear, is about the possible or potential threat. Hostility occurs when an outrage occurs toward the people who were a part of the problem and agencies who are accountable. These people are seen as the enemy since their behavior is viewed as a danger to society. Consensus includes a distributed agreement that an actual threat is going to take place. This is where the media and other sources come in to aid in spreading of the panic. Disproportionality compares people's reactions to the actual seriousness of the condition. Volatility is when there is no longer any more panic.

Causes
 Grass Root Model describes that social panic commonly occurs first through the people in society. The feeling that something meaningful is threatened is dispersed throughout everyone in society. This sense of panic not only displays itself through the people but also through areas such as the media and political groups. The media serves as a way to present the public opinion about the reality of the situation. This theory states that the media can't report concern where none originally exists. The media and politicians are merely an outlet for displaying what people are expressing. Furthermore, the media can affect the way the public sees situations. An example of this theory is how people cause social panics due to nuclear power. After the Three Mile Island accident, where there was a nuclear meltdown,  people evacuated their homes even though no workers or residents living in that area were injured or killed. The only reason people in that area were aware of what was going on was due to the social panic that people caused when they reacted to the situation. This panic was caused by the general public, not by elites or interest group as in the models explained below.
 The Elite-Engineered Model explains that social panics are exaggerated or invented problems created by elites or people who are considered higher among others in society. These type of people produce fear among the other classes over an issue that is not considered dangerous to the society. The reason for these actions is to redirect the attention away from the problems that impact the elite or those in power. The people who are considered elite could be someone who runs a company or is very rich, as they may have connections with the media and are familiar with politicians that can make proposals in their favor. An example that illustrates this theory can be seen in the Russians, specifically the Czars, who turned the focus away from the anger of poverty by spreading a Jewish conspiracy. This caused mobs to form and kill Jewish communities. This capacity of the elites to control direction allows them to accomplish their own goals. They want to continue to benefit from the economic and political inequality.
 The Interest-Group Model are made by people in interest groups who direct the public's focus on actions that are intended to be morally negative and be a danger to society. They want them to recognize a problem that affects them directly. Unlike in the Elite-Engineered model, the interest groups are the ones who create social panic. Interest groups believe they are providing a public service because they will benefit from what they are doing. They do this by using the media to influence public opinion. If they are successful in doing this, it will call attention to their particular interest group, gain the trust of society and wealth, and be more advanced than opposing interest groups. An example that demonstrates this theory is when politicians, in order to get reelected, used the issue of drug abuse in the United States to cause social panic. However, even though they wanted to remain in office they still believed that drug use was a problem they wanted to address to the public.

The media
The media plays a crucial part in delivering social reaction. According to Stanley Cohen, there are three processes that the media expresses: Exaggeration and distortion, prediction, and symbolization.

Exaggeration and distortion

In this process, the media can "over-report" with their choice of words. For example, the word "disturbance" can be used to mean having a noise complaint due to loud music next door and a group of people acting violently by throwing rocks and setting vehicles on fire. The wording of the stories can make a minor problem seem more serious than it really is. This can make people overreact in response to relatively minor problems and may lead them to believe that disturbances, acts of terrorism, riots, and instances have the same meaning.

Furthermore, the headlines used by the media might cause society to act irrationally to a story about minor issues. They can be misleading and can report information that has nothing to do with the actual story. Negative words such as "violence" can be used when there was no violence involved. The media can also point to specific characteristics that are the reason for the crime that was committed. For example, a story can discuss a murder, but the headline might focus on the hoodie the culprit was wearing. Emphasizing the hoodie will draw attention to what the person was wearing instead of the murder that took place. This causes people to become paranoid and overreact when they see someone wearing clothing that looks suspicious.

Prediction

This is where the media speculates that an incident might occur again. The media can report that an event will occur in the future, which is not always the case. People involved describe what should be done the next time it happens and what precautions should be taken. Predicting the future can cause people to constantly think about what could go wrong and lead to catastrophe. This can cause major stress and cause people to have social panics more often. However, there are certain situations where making predictions is necessary for security, such as hurricanes, earthquakes, and other natural disasters.

Symbolization

This involves stereotypes, words and images that possess symbolic powers that can cause different emotions. Symbolization can be described in three processes.  It includes words such as "deviant" and, as Cohen would say, "it becomes symbolic of a certain status." By this he means that the word represents something meaningful. Then the object, which can include clothing, represents the word. Therefore, the object can also symbolize the status. Neutral words can symbolize an event or emotion. For example, people can have specific feelings connected to the word "Hiroshima" that remind them of the bombing that occurred there. Furthermore, the use of labels given to a person or word puts them in a certain group in society. Those individuals that are in that group are viewed and interpreted based on their label.

Symbolization, exaggeration and distortion are similar in the sense that they both use misleading headlines that creates negative symbols. For example, images can be posed to seem more dramatic or intense than they really are. Through both of these procedures, it is easy to cause people to come to conclusions that the news and photographs always display reality.

Reaction

After the events of 9/11, people were left in fear of crisis occurring again. According to Robert Wuthnow in his book Be Very Afraid, people have responded aggressively, spending large amounts of money in fighting terrorism. The United States has spent billions and trillions on defense and homeland security respectively. However, the problem lies in how we react.

Since people have become more defensive, the focus needs to be on the correct way to act instead of an improper response. As mentioned earlier, predicting about the endless possibilities about what can happen can be just dangerous as the threat itself. People don't believe they can defend themselves from future terrorist's attacks. Individuals were constantly reminded of the concern and fear they should be experiencing by the tremendous amount of media coverage and books being published after the September 11 attacks. The event caused "personal engagement" throughout the country. In Boston, people questioned others about ties they had with Osama bin Laden. These attacks were unlike any other attacks since people experienced them firsthand whether on the news or in person. The natural response of Americans during this time was to take action—facing the fear of terrorism, whether by taking revenge or through urging caution.

Criticism
Angela McRobbie and Sarah Thornton claim that Stanley Cohen's work on moral panic is outdated and argue that more modern information is required. McRobbie suggests that idea of moral panic has become so common that the media knowingly and mindfully uses it. Thornton argues that the media originally caused moral panics inadvertently; however, the media now manipulates it on its own.

Yvonne Jewkes acknowledged problems and formed concepts about moral panic. To begin with, she described the term as vague and the failure to clarify the position of the public "as media audiences or a body of opinion". She goes on to explain that the social panics are not gladly received by the government. There is also no proof that society has an extensive social anxiety surrounding them. Jewkew, as also mentioned by McRobbie, believes that moral panic is widely used by the media. She concluded that in order for this to become a "sound conceptual basis" it needs to be revised and carefully improved.

See also

 Deviancy amplification spiral
 Moral panic
 Social anxiety

References

Social phenomena
Mass psychogenic illness
Deviance (sociology)